Patrick Rooney (born 16 June 1997 in St. Helens, Merseyside) is an English professional squash player. As of January 2023, he was ranked number 18 in the world.

References

1997 births
Living people
English male squash players
Squash players at the 2022 Commonwealth Games